Călugăreanu is a Romanian surname that may refer to:

Cornel Călugăreanu (born 1930), Romanian basketball player 
Dimitrie Călugăreanu (1868–1937), Romanian physician, naturalist and physiologist
Gheorghe Călugăreanu (1902-1976), Romanian mathematician, son of Dimitrie Călugăreanu
Vitalie Călugăreanu (born 1977), Moldovan journalist

Romanian-language surnames